"The Wolf" is a song by English rock band Mumford & Sons. It was released as the second single from their third studio album Wilder Mind on 9 April 2015 and charted in multiple countries. The official music video for the song was uploaded on 30 June 2015 to the band's Vevo channel on YouTube.

Composition
"The Wolf" is an alternative rock and garage rock song. The song displays the band's change in sound from heavily folk-inspired to more electric instruments. Most noticeably, the use of the banjo is absent from this song as well as Wilder Mind, the album which the song is featured on.

Music video
The official music video for the song, lasting three minutes and fifty-five seconds, was uploaded on 30 June 2015 to the band's Vevo channel on YouTube. Directed by Marcus Haney, the video takes place at the 2015 Bonnaroo Music Festival as the band explores its sights and sounds. It also showcases the headlining performance by the band. In the video the band members are dressed in various costumes; Marcus Mumford can be seen wearing a Robin Hood costume, Ted Dwane in giant chicken costume, Winston Marshall in a wedding dress and Ben Lovett in a fox costume. Actor Ed Helms can also be seen in the video; the actor performed at the festival that year alongside Dierks Bentley.

Critical reception
The single has received positive critical reception. Sputnikmusic labeled the song as a "massive highlight" from Wilder Mind as well as a "beautiful form of alternative rock." Rolling Stone ranked "The Wolf" at number 43 on its annual year-end list to find the best songs of 2015.

Track listing

7" vinyl
 Island/Glassnote/Gentlemen of the Road — 4730218

Digital download

Charts and certifications

Weekly charts

Year-end charts

Certifications

Release history

References

2014 songs
2015 singles
Glassnote Records singles
Island Records singles
Mumford & Sons songs
Song recordings produced by James Ford (musician)
Songs written by Ben Lovett (British musician)
Songs written by Marcus Mumford
Songs written by Ted Dwane
Songs written by Winston Marshall